The Originator or Originator may refer to:

 Bo Diddley (1928–2008), blues and rock and roll musician.
 U-Roy (born 1942), reggae musician.
 DJ Screw (1971–2000), DJ based in Houston, Texas.
 Originator (novel), a 1999 novel by Claire Carmichael.
   Originator (company), a 2013 Company in the United States of America.